Barood may refer to:

 Gunpowder, which is known as "barood" or "barud" in various languages
 Barood (1960 film), a Bollywood film of 1960 starring Kumkum
 Barood (1976 film), a film by Pramod Chakravorty starring Rishi Kapoor and Reena Roy
 Barood (1998 film), a Hindi film starring Akshay Kumar and Raveena Tandon 
 Barood (2000 film), a Pakistani film of 2000
 Barood (2003 film), an Assamese-language film
 Barood (2004 film), a Bengali-language Indian film starring Mithun Chakraborty, Usha Sree, Lokesh and Rajatava Dutt
 Barood (restaurant), a bar-restaurant in Jerusalem, Israel

See also
 Barud